Wałbrzych is a Polish parliamentary constituency in the Lower Silesian Voivodeship.  It elects eight members of the Sejm.

The district has the number '2' and is named after the city of Wałbrzych.  It includes the counties of Dzierżoniów, Kłodzko, Świdnica, Wałbrzych, and Ząbkowice Śląskie.

List of members

Sejm

Footnotes

Electoral districts of Poland
Wałbrzych
Lower Silesian Voivodeship